Kulsk is a rural locality (a selo) in Khorinsky District, Republic of Buryatia, Russia. The population was 173 as of 2010. There are 6 streets.

Geography 
Kulsk is located 16 km west of Khorinsk (the district's administrative centre) by road. Kulsky Stanok is the nearest rural locality.

References 

Rural localities in Khorinsky District